Calvin Forrest Quate (December 7, 1923 – July 6, 2019) was one of the inventors of the atomic force microscope.  He was a professor emeritus of Applied Physics and Electrical Engineering at Stanford University.

Education
He earned his bachelor's degree in electrical engineering from the University of Utah College of Engineering in 1944, and his Ph.D. from Stanford University in 1950.

Career and research
Quate is known for his work on acoustic and atomic force microscopy. The scanning acoustic microscope, invented with a colleague in 1973, has resolution exceeding optical microscopes, revealing structure in opaque or even transparent materials not visible to optics.

In 1981, Quate read about a new type of microscope able to examine electrically conductive materials. Together with Gerd Binnig and Christoph Gerber, he developed a related instrument that would work on non-conductive materials, including biological tissue, and the Atomic Force Microscope was born. AFM traces surface contours using a needle to maintain constant pressure against the surface to reveal atomic detail. AFM is the foundation of the $100 million nanotechnology industry. Binnig, Quate and Gerber were rewarded with the Kavli Prize in 2016 for developing the Atomic Force Microscope.

Quate was a member of the National Academy of Engineering and National Academy of Sciences. He was awarded the 1980 IEEE Morris N. Liebmann Memorial Award and the IEEE Medal of Honor in 1988 for "the invention and development of the scanning acoustic microscope." Quate became a senior research fellow at the Palo Alto Research Center (PARC) in 1984. In 2000, he became a recipient of the Joseph F. Keithley Award For Advances in Measurement Science. He was a fellow of the Norwegian Academy of Science and Letters. Quate died on July 6, 2019 at the age of 95.

References

External links
 Obituary Stanford University
 IEEE History Center biography

1923 births
2019 deaths
People from White Pine County, Nevada
Members of the United States National Academy of Sciences
American inventors
American electrical engineers
Foreign Members of the Royal Society
IEEE Medal of Honor recipients
Fellow Members of the IEEE
National Medal of Science laureates
University of Utah alumni
Stanford University School of Engineering faculty
Members of the United States National Academy of Engineering
Fellows of the Royal Microscopical Society
Scientists at PARC (company)
Members of the Norwegian Academy of Science and Letters
Kavli Prize laureates in Nanoscience